Balvicar is a village on the island of Seil, a small island  southwest of Oban, Scotland. It is one of three villages on the island along with Ellenabeich and Clachan-Seil. It was a former slate-mining village beginning in the 16th century, and eventually ceased mining after sporadic operation between the 1940s and 60s.

Balvicar contains a shop which also serves as a post office. The Isle of Seil Golf Club is also situated in the village. There is a fish factory which processes locally caught langoustines that go for export, and a number of creel fishing boats operate out of Balvicar Bay. There is a boatyard which offers repairs and maintenance for both fishing and pleasure vessels plus winter storage for yachts and small commercial vessels.

, 2.68% of people in Balvicar could speak Scottish Gaelic.

References

Villages on Seil